Lanbi Kyun, also Lambi Island and Lampi Island, (Sullivan's Island) is an island in the Mergui Archipelago, Burma.

Ecology
The Lampi Island Marine National Park was designated in 1996.

Unconfirmed reports of the presence of Sumatran rhinoceros on Lanbi have been widely discredited.

Important Bird Area
The island, along with some adjacent islets, has been designated an Important Bird Area (IBA) by BirdLife International because it supports a population of Vulnerable plain-pouched hornbills.

2004 tsunami
Some 200 Moken people were found dead on a small island off Lanbi following the 2004 Indian Ocean earthquake and tsunami.

References

External links
Myanmar Ecotourism - Ministry of Hotels and Tourism
Mergui Archipelago

Mergui Archipelago
Important Bird Areas of Myanmar
Important Bird Areas of Indian Ocean islands